Spruce Cliff is a residential neighbourhood in the southwest quadrant of Calgary, Alberta. It is bounded to the north by the CPR tracks and the Bow River, to the east by the Shaganappi golf course and 33 Street W, to the south by Bow Trail and to the west by 37 Street W.

The land was annexed in 1910, and Spruce Cliff was established in 1950. It is represented in the Calgary City Council by the Ward 8 councillor.

Demographics

Residents in this community had a median household income of $42,025 in 2000, and there were 31.8% low income residents living in the neighbourhood. As of 2000, 28% of the residents were immigrants. A proportion of 53.8% of the buildings were condominiums or apartments, and 65.1% of the housing was used for renting.

Education
The community is served by Spruce Cliff Elementary public school.

See also
List of neighbourhoods in Calgary

References

External links
Spruce Cliff Community Association

Neighbourhoods in Calgary